TLT may refer to:

Businesses and organizations:
Tallinna Linnatranspordi AS, an Estonian transportation company
TLT LLP, a UK law firm

In technology:
Test loop translator, a type of radio frequency converter

In transportation:
Tai Lam Tunnel, a transport tunnel part of Route 3 in Hong Kong
Tuluksak Airport, Alaska (IATA code TLT)

Other uses:
Timor Leste Time, the time zone of East Timor, UTC+9:00
Troop Leadership Training, a program within the Boy Scouts of America
Sepa-Teluti language of Indonesia (ISO-639 code "tlt")
The Living Tombstone, Israeli-American electronic rock band on YouTube